The Shakti Mata Memorial Chatriya is a cenotaph in the city of Pokhran, Rajasthan, India. Constructed in red sandstone, it was erected to honor the deceased mahrajas of the local royal family. The site contains a number of chhatris (meaning umbrella in hindi, which references the shape of the domes of the structure) and lies outside the city.

See also
 Architecture of Rajasthan
 UNESCO Heritage Hill Forts of Rajasthan

References 

Cenotaphs in India
Jaisalmer district
Monuments and memorials in Rajasthan
Rajput architecture